Edwin T. Cassian was a former Major League Baseball pitcher. He was born on November 8, 1867, in Wilbraham, Massachusetts. He played just one season in the Major League Baseball, with the Philadelphia Phillies and Washington Senators in 1891 at the age of 23. Cassian had a 3–7 career record in 13 games and an ERA of 4.45. He died on September 10, 1918, in Meriden, Connecticut.

External links
Baseball Reference

1867 births
1918 deaths
Baseball players from Massachusetts
Major League Baseball pitchers
Philadelphia Phillies players
Washington Senators (1891–1899) players
19th-century baseball players
Hartford (minor league baseball) players
New Haven Nutmegs players
Providence Grays (minor league) players
Springfield Ponies players
Brockton Shoemakers players
Hartford Bluebirds players
People from Wilbraham, Massachusetts